The Hugh Bright Douglas House is a historic house in Fayetteville, Tennessee. It was built in 1894 for a Confederate veteran. It is listed on the National Register of Historic Places.

History
The house was built in 1894 for Hugh Bright Douglas, the grandson of settler James Bright. During the American Civil War of 1861–1865, Douglas joined the Confederate States Army and served under generals Nathan Bedford Forrest and Joseph Wheeler. Douglas lived here with his wife, née Margaret Terrett, and their son, Byrd Douglas. It was inherited by his granddaughter, Sarah Byrd Douglas Posey, in 1958, and sold out of the family in 1961.

Architectural significance
The house was designed by Rickman & Bills in the Steamboat Gothic architectural style. It has been listed on the National Register of Historic Places since March 25, 1982.

References

Houses on the National Register of Historic Places in Tennessee
National Register of Historic Places in Lincoln County, Tennessee
Victorian architecture in Tennessee
Houses completed in 1894